WBCR (1470 AM) is a radio station licensed to Alcoa, Tennessee, United States.  The station is currently owned by Blount County Broadcasting Corp. The station programming is a mixture of religious and conservative talk and religious music.

History
The station went on the air as WEAG in 1957, in a full-service/MOR format, later changing its call sign to WMDR ("The Music Doctor") on 1984-07-16, and programming Top-40. Later, the format switched to easy listening.  On 01-11-1993, the station changed its call sign to the current WBCR .

References

External links

BCR
Radio stations established in 1957
Contemporary hit radio stations in the United States
Alcoa, Tennessee